Tricyclics are cyclic chemical compounds that contain three fused rings of atoms.

Many compounds have a tricyclic structure, but in pharmacology, the term has traditionally been reserved to describe heterocyclic drugs. They include antidepressants, antipsychotics, anticonvulsants, and antihistamines (as antiallergens, anti-motion sickness drugs, antipruritics, and hypnotics/sedatives) of the dibenzazepine, dibenzocycloheptene, dibenzothiazepine, dibenzothiepin, phenothiazine, and thioxanthene chemical classes, and others.

History
 Promethazine and other first generation antihistamines with a tricyclic structure were discovered in the 1940s.
 Chlorpromazine, derived from promethazine originally as a sedative, was found to have neuroleptic properties in the early 1950s, and was the first typical antipsychotic.
 Imipramine, originally investigated as an antipsychotic, was discovered in the early 1950s, and was the first tricyclic antidepressant.
 Carbamazepine was discovered in 1953, and was subsequently introduced as an anticonvulsant in 1965.
 Antidepressants with a tetracyclic structure such as mianserin and maprotiline were first developed in the 1970s as tetracyclic antidepressants.
 Clozapine was introduced as the first atypical antipsychotic in the 1990s.
 Loratadine was introduced as a non-sedating second generation antihistamine in the 1990s.

Gallery

See also
 Bisulepin
 Tetracyclic
 Tricyclic tropane analogs
 Heterocyclic

References

 
Heterocyclic compounds with 3 rings